Finally Found Someone is a 2017 Filipino romantic comedy film starring John Lloyd Cruz and Sarah Geronimo. The film is directed by Theodore Boborol. It is under the production of Star Cinema and Viva Films. The film was released in cinemas nationwide on July 26, 2017. The film marks the reunion of Sarah and John Lloyd after their three successful movies together: A Very Special Love (2008), You Changed My Life (2009) and It Takes a Man and a Woman (2013), all produced by Star Cinema and Viva Films. The principal photography for the film started in late February 2017. According to Star Cinema, the movie earned ₱20 million on its opening day despite the bad weather. The movie breached  mark on its fourth blockbuster day. As of August 6, 2017, Finally Found Someone had grossed . As of August 15, 2017, the film had reached  worldwide.

Plot 
Aprilyn, who is left by her groom, Randy, on the day of their wedding, goes viral online. Devastated, she meets Raffy who works at a PR agency hired by the father of the groom to help her move on, so that Randy will win the mayoral election when the public "forgives" him, once Aprilyn forgives him. As the storyline unfolds, it is revealed that both Aprilyn and Raffy were marked by a childhood in which they each had a parent who went overseas to work, leaving each of them impaired in their relationship abilities. Each contributes to the other's self-discovery, and over the course of the movie they gain insights into themselves and a love for one another.

Cast

Main cast

 John Lloyd Cruz as Rafael "Raffy" Sandoval
 Sarah Geronimo as Aprilyn Esguerra

Supporting cast
 Joey Marquez as Pondong Esguerra
 Yayo Aguila as Maybelyn Esguerra
 Dennis Padilla as Mayor Garcia
 Tetchie Agbayani as Evy
 Christian Bables as Noah Alcala
 Alwyn Uytingco as Ron
 Alexa Ilacad as Junilyn Esguerra
 Joj Agpangan as Mary
 Justin Cuyugan as Vic
 Ruby Ruiz as Babylyn
 PJ Endrinal as Markus
 Lemuel Pelayo as Harold
 Cara Eriguel as Denise
 Negi as Alfaro
 Marnie Lapus as Rachel Santos
 Axel Torres as Rick
 April Matienzo as Trina
 Leo Rialp as Mr. G
 Milo Elmido Jr. as Gian
 Zachie Reighn Rivera

Special participation
 Enchong Dee as Randy Garcia

Release

Promotion
On July 6, 2017, Star Cinema released the trailer of the film via Facebook, it garnered millions of views and thousands of shares in few hours. John Lloyd Cruz and Sarah Geronimo guested on various TV shows including Gandang Gabi Vice, Magandang Buhay and Tonight with Boy Abunda to promote the film. The tandem also appeared on concert-variety show ASAP and sung the 1996 hit Barbra Streisand and Bryan Adams' song I Finally Found Someone.

Theatrical run 
The film was premiered at two different locations in Pasig and Quezon City on July 24. It was released on Philippine Cinemas on July 26 and earned PHP 20 million despite of bad weather. It was reported to gain PHP 100 million in just 4 days. As of August 6, 2017, the movie has already grossed PHP 200 million. As of August 13, 2017, the movie has already grossed more than PHP 300 million.

Soundtrack 
Sarah Geronimo recorded the song "Just Fall In Love Again", which served as the movie's theme song. Star Music released the official music video of the song on July 10, 2017. Removed without the first chorus and third verse.

See also 
A Very Special Love
You Changed My Life
It Takes a Man and a Woman

References

External links
 

2017 films
Philippine romantic comedy films
Star Cinema films
Viva Films films
2017 romantic comedy films